San Juan de Dios Hospital is a symbol and living history of the contemporary healthcare model and a spirit of solidarity for Granada.  It was founded in 1544 by San Juan de Dios and his disciples in 1553 by his disciples. For five centuries, the brothers of the Hospitality Order of San Juan de Dios ran this hospital located in a Renaissance building, which was renovated and expanded in the seventeenth and eighteenth centuries, next to the Basilica del Santo, and it maintained from its origin the dedication to healthcare for the most disadvantaged people with entire dedication to the city of Granada.

This hospital is, therefore, a key piece to understand the history of the city over the years and the contribution of the Order to the improvement of the lives of its citizens. During centuries the Order claim in different actions the recovery of San Juan de Dios Hospital with the aim of preserving the historical and patrimonial legacy to put it at the service of the city and those most in need. Over time, the Order of San Juan de Dios made numerous attempts to recover what is considered the founding house of the Institution, until May 2015 when the Provincial Council of Granada approved a total transfer. 

Despite its loss by the Order after the confiscation of Mendizábal in 1835 the building has always been part of the idiosyncrasy and spirit of the city as a symbol of hospitality. In the 16th century there were 6 big halls for an infirmary. The hospital is famous for its baroque interior and important artworks.

References

Hospitals in Andalusia
Renaissance architecture in Granada
Azulejos in buildings in Andalusia
1544 establishments in Spain
Hospitals established in the 16th century